Dunn House may refer to:

in the United States
(by state)
Dunn House (Hampton, Arkansas), listed on the NRHP in Arkansas
Globe Hotel (McDonough, Georgia), also known as Dunn House, listed on the NRHP in Georgia
Dunn-Watkins House, Lancaster, KY, listed on the NRHP in Kentucky
Peter Dunn House, McAfee, KY, listed on the NRHP in Kentucky
Nathaniel Dunn House, Nicolasville, KY, listed on the NRHP in Kentucky
Dunn House (Greenwood, Louisiana), listed on the NRHP in Louisiana
Robert C. Dunn House, Princeton, MN, listed on the NRHP in Minnesota
Andrew C. Dunn House, Winnebago, MN, listed on the NRHP in Minnesota
Zaccheus Dunn House, Woodstown, NJ, listed on the NRHP in New Jersey
Purefoy-Dunn Plantation, Wake Forest, NC, listed on the NRHP in North Carolina
Shedd-Dunn House, Columbus, OH, listed on the NRHP in Ohio
Patrick Dunn Ranch, Ashland, OR, listed on the NRHP in Oregon
Dunn Ranch, Novillo Line Camp, Corpus Christi, TX, listed on the NRHP in Texas
Frederick and Della Dunn House, Springville, UT, listed on the NRHP in Utah